This is a list of examples of lengths, in metres in order to give an understanding of lengths.

Shorter than 1 ym 

  metres =  qm = the Planck length
  metres = 1 qm = 1 quectometre, the smallest named subdivision of the metre in the SI base unit of length.
  metres = 1 rm = 1 rontometre =  quectometres

1 ym to 1 zm 

  metres = 1 ym = 1 yoctometre =  rontometres
  metres = 10 ym
  metres = 20 ym, the effective cross-section radius of 1 MeV neutrinos as measured by Clyde Cowan and Frederick Reines

1 zm to 1 am 

  metres = 1 zm = 1 zeptometre =  yoctometres
  metres = radius of effective cross section for a 20 GeV neutrino scattering off a nucleon
  metres = radius of effective cross section for a 250 GeV neutrino scattering off a nucleon
  metres = 10 zm
  metres = 100 zm
 310 zm — de Broglie wavelength of protons at the Large Hadron Collider (4 TeV as of 2012)

1 am to 1 fm 

  metres = 1 am = 1 attometre =  zeptometres
 1 am — sensitivity of the LIGO detector for gravitational waves
  metres = 10 am
  metres = 100 am
 0.85 fm — approximate proton radius

1 fm to 1 pm 

  metres = 1 fm = 1 femtometre =  attometres
 1.5 fm — diameter of the Scattering Cross Section of an 11 MeV proton with a target proton
  — classical electron radius
 7 fm - the radius of the effective scattering cross section for a gold nucleus scattering a 6 MeV alpha particle over 140 degrees
  metres = 10 fm
  metres = 100 fm
  metres = 1 pm = 1 picometre =  femtometres

1 picometre
Lengths between 10−12 and 10−11 m (1 and 10 pm).

 1 pm = 1 picometre =  femtometres
 1 pm = distance between atomic nuclei in a white dwarf star
 2.4 pm — The Compton wavelength of the electron.
 5 pm — shorter X-ray wavelengths (approx.)

10 picometres
Lengths between 10−11 and 10−10 m (10 pm and 100 pm).
 25 pm — empirical radius of hydrogen atom
 28 pm — covalent radius of helium atom
 31 pm — covalent radius of hydrogen atom
 31 pm — calculated radius of helium atom
 ~50 pm — best resolution of a high-resolution transmission electron microscope
 53 pm — calculated radius of hydrogen atom

100 picometres
Lengths between 10−10 and 10−9 m (100 pm and 1 nm).

100 pm — 1 angstrom
100 pm — covalent radius of sulfur atom
120 pm — van der Waals radius of a neutral hydrogen atom
126 pm — covalent radius of ruthenium atom
135 pm — covalent radius of technetium atom
153 pm — covalent radius of silver atom
154 pm — mode length of (C-C) covalent bond
155 pm — covalent radius of zirconium atom
175 pm — covalent radius of thulium atom
200 pm — highest resolution of a typical electron microscope
225 pm — covalent radius of caesium atom
340 pm — thickness of single layer graphene
356.68 pm — width of diamond cell (unit cell)
403 pm — width of lithium fluoride cell
500 pm — width of α helix protein
560 pm — width of sodium chloride cell
700 pm — width of glucose molecule
780 pm — mean width of quartz cell
820 pm — mean width of ice cell
900 pm — mean width of coesite cell
900 pm — width of sucrose molecule

10 nanometres 1x10−9m

To help compare different orders of magnitude this page lists lengths between 10−8 and 10−7 m (10 and 100 nm).

10 nm = 10 nanometres = 10−8 metres
10 nm — lower size of tobacco smoke
10 nm Shortest extreme ultraviolet wavelength or longest X-ray wavelength
11 nm — the average half-pitch of a memory cell speculated to be manufactured in 2015.
16 nm — technology is projected to be reached by semiconductor companies in the 2013 timeframe
18 nm — diameter of tobacco mosaic virus 
20 nm — width of bacterial flagellum
20 nm to 80 nm — thickness of cell wall in Gram-positive bacteria
22 nm — Smallest feature size of production microprocessors in September 2009
22 nm — the average half-pitch of a memory cell expected to be manufactured at around the 2011–2011 time frame.
30 nm — lower size of cooking oil smoke
32 nm — the average half-pitch of a memory cell manufactured at around the 2009–2010 time frame.
45 nm — the average half-pitch of a memory cell manufactured at around the 2007–2008 time frame.
50 nm — upper size for airborne virus particles
50 nm — flying height of the head of a hard disk
65 nm — the average half-pitch of a memory cell manufactured at around the 2005–2006 time frame.
90 nm — the average half-pitch of a memory cell manufactured at around the 2002–2003 time frame.
 (ranges from 7 to 3000 nanometres)

100 nanometres
Lengths between 10−7 and 10−6 m (100 nm and 1 µm).

100 nm — greatest particle size that can fit through a surgical mask

120 nm — diameter of a human immunodeficiency virus (HIV) 
125 nm — standard depth of pits on compact discs (width: 500 nm, length: 850 nm to 3.5 µm)
180 nm — typical length of the rabies virus
200 nm — typical size of a Mycoplasma bacterium, among the smallest bacteria
300-400 nm — near ultraviolet wavelength

400–420 nm — wavelength of violet light
420–440 nm — wavelength of indigo light
440–500 nm — wavelength of blue light
500–520 nm — wavelength of cyan light
520–565 nm — wavelength of green light
565–590 nm — wavelength of yellow light
590–625 nm — wavelength of orange light
625–700 nm — wavelength of red light
700–1400 nm — wavelength of near-infrared radiation

1 micrometre

To help compare different orders of magnitude this page lists some items with lengths between 10−6 and 10−5 m (between 1 and 10 micrometres, or µm).

~0.7–300 µm — Wavelength of infrared radiation
1 µm — the side of square of area 10−12 m2
1 µm — edge of cube of volume 10−18 m3 (one femtolitre)
1–10 µm — diameter of a typical bacterium
1.55 µm — wavelength of light used in optical fibre
3–4 µm — size of a typical yeast cell
5 µm — length of a typical human spermatozoon's head
6 µm — anthrax spore
7 µm — diameter of the nucleus of a typical eukaryotic cell
about 7 μm — diameter of human red blood cells
3–8 µm — width of strand of spider web silk
8 µm — width of a chloroplast
9 µm — thickness of the tape in a 120-minute compact cassette.
about 10 µm — size of a fog, mist or cloud water droplet

10 micrometres
To help compare different orders of magnitude, this page lists lengths between 10−5 and 10−4 m (10 µm and 100 µm).

 10 µm — width of cotton fibre
 10 µm — transistor width of the Intel 4004, the world's first commercial microprocessor
 10 µm — mean longest dimension of a human red blood cell
 5–20 µm — dust mite excreta
 10.6 µm — wavelength of light emitted by a carbon dioxide laser
 15 µm — width of silk fibre
 16 µm — diameter of a micromirror in a typical Digital micromirror device
 17 µm — length of a tobacco mosaic virus
 17 µm — minimum width of a strand of human hair
 17.6 µm — one twip, a unit of length in typography
 10 to 55 µm — width of wool fibre
 25.4 µm — 1/1000 inch, commonly referred to as 1 mil in the U.S. and 1 thou in the UK
 
 50 µm — typical length of Euglena gracilis, a flagellate protist
 50 µm — typical length of a human liver cell, an average-sized body cell
 78 µm — width of a pixel on the display of the iPhone 4, marketed as Retina Display 
 90 µm — paper thickness in average
1 myriometre, Distances shorter than 100 µm

100 micrometres
To help compare different orders of magnitude, this page lists lengths between 10−4 and 10−3 m (100 µm and 1 mm).

 100 µm – 1/10 of a millimetre
 100 µm – 0.00394 inches
 100 µm – average diameter of a strand of human hair
 100 µm – thickness of a coat of paint
 100 µm – length of a dust particle
 120 µm – diameter of a human ovum
 170 µm – length of the largest mammalian sperm cell (rat)
 181 µm – maximum width of a strand of human hair
 100–400 µm – length of Demodex mites living in human hair follicles
 200 µm – typical length of Paramecium caudatum, a ciliate protist
 250–300 µm – length of a dust mite
 340 µm – length of a single pixel on a 17-inch monitor with a resolution of 1024×768
 500 µm – typical length of Amoeba proteus, an amoeboid protist
 
 560 µm - thickness of the central area of a human cornea
 760 µm – thickness of a credit card

1 millimeter
To help compare different orders of magnitude this page lists lengths between 10−3 and 10−2 m (1 mm and 1 cm).

 1.0 mm —  of a metre
 1.0 mm — side of square of area 1 mm2
 1.0 mm — diameter of a pinhead
 1.5 mm — length of average flea
 2.54 mm — distance between pins on old DIP (dual-inline-package) electronic components 
 5 mm — length of average red ant
 5.56×45mm NATO — standard ammunition size
 7.62×51mm NATO — common military ammunition size

1 centimeter

Lengths between 10−2 and 10−1 m (1 and 10 cm).

 1 cm — 10 millimetres
 1 cm — 0.39 inches
 1 cm — edge of square of area 1 cm2
 1 cm — edge of cube of volume 1 ml
 1 cm — approximate width of average fingernail
 1.5 cm — length of a very large mosquito
 2 cm — approximate width of an adult human finger
 2.54 cm — 1 inch
 3.1 cm — 1 attoparsec (10−18 parsecs)
 3.5 cm — width of film commonly used in motion pictures and still photography
 4.3 cm — minimum diameter of a golf ball
 7.3-7.5 cm — diameter of a baseball
 8.6 cm × 5.4 cm — dimensions of a typical credit card

1 decimetre
Lengths between 10 and 100 centimetres (10−1 and 1 metre).

Conversions
10 centimetres (abbreviated to 10 cm) is equal to
 1 decimetre (dm), a term not in common use
 100 millimetres
 3.9 inches
 A side of a square of area 0.01 m2

Wavelengths
10 cm = 1.0 dm – wavelength of the highest UHF radio frequency, 3 GHz
12 cm = 1.2 dm – wavelength of the 2.45 GHz ISM radio band
21 cm = 2.1 dm – wavelength of the 1.4 GHz hydrogen emission line, a hyperfine transition of the hydrogen atom
100 cm = 10 dm – wavelength of the lowest UHF radio frequency, 300 MHz

Human-defined scales and structures

 10.16 cm = 1.016 dm — 1 hand used in measuring height of horses (4 inches)
 12 cm = 1.2 dm — diameter of a Compact Disc (CD) (= 120 mm)
 15 cm = 1.5 dm — length of a Bic pen with cap on
 22 cm = 2.2 dm — diameter of a typical soccer ball
 30.48 cm = 3.048 dm — 1 foot
 30 cm = 3 dm — typical school-use ruler length (= 300 mm)
 60 cm = 6 dm — standard depth (front to back) of a domestic kitchen worktop in Europe (= 600 mm)
 90 cm = 9 dm — average length of a rapier, a fencing sword
 91.44 cm = 9.144 dm — one yard
 Cigarettes 100 mm (4 in) in length

Nature

 
 
 
 29.98 cm = distance light travels in one nanosecond
 
 56 cm = 5.6 dm — the length of the average erect horse pеnis

 66 cm — length of the longest pine cones (produced by the sugar pine)

Longer
1 metre
 1 decametre
 1 hectometre
 1 kilometre
 1 myriametre
 100 kilometres
 1 megametre
 10 megametres
 100 megametres

1 gigametre

Lengths starting at 109 metres (1 gigametre (Gm) or 1 million kilometres).

Distances shorter than 109 metres
 1.4 Gm — Diameter of Sun
 1.5 Gm — (proposed) Expected orbit from Earth of the James Webb Space Telescope
 2.19 Gm — Closest approach of Comet Lexell to Earth, happened on 1 July 1770; closest comet approach on record
 3 Gm — Total length of "wiring" in the human brain.
 4.2 Gm — Diameter of Algol B
 5.0 Gm — Closest approach of Comet Halley to Earth, happened on 10 April 837
 5.0 Gm — (proposed) Size of the arms of the giant triangle shaped Michelson interferometer of the Laser Interferometer Space Antenna (LISA) planned to start observations in or around 2015.
 7.9 Gm — Diameter of Gamma Orionis
 9.0 Gm — Estimated diameter of the event horizon of Sagittarius A*, the supermassive black hole in the center of the Milky Way galaxy

Longer
 10 gigametres
 100 gigametres
 1 terametre
 10 terametres
 100 terametres
 1 petametre
 10 petametres
 100 petametres
 1 exametre
 10 exametres
 100 exametres
 1 zettametre
 10 zettametres
 100 zettametres
 1 yottametre
 10 yottametres
 100 yottametres

See also
Length
Orders of magnitude (length)

Notes

References